Airton Ribeiro Santos (born 21 February 1990), simply known as Airton, is a Brazilian professional footballer who plays as a defensive midfielder for Al-Kahrabaa FC.

Club career

Early career
Airton started his career at Nova Iguaçu at the age of 13. At the end of 2007, Flamengo's youth coach Adílio asked for his loan. Airton also spent four months on loan at Mesquita in 2007, playing on the youth team.

Flamengo
Airton arrived at Flamengo, on loan, on 7 January 2008 to play for the club's youth team. His rights belonged to, at the time, Nova Iguaçu, which had him under contract until 2010. He would play for Flamengo until the end of 2008, but in 2008, Flamengo officially signed him, acquiring part of his rights — Nova Iguaçu and Traffic, an investors group, shared the other parts of his rights.

His first match in the first-team was in a 1–1 draw against Vasco da Gama on 6 April 2008, and his debut in the Brazilian Série A was at Mineirão Stadium, coming off the bench in a 1–1 draw against Atlético Mineiro on 9 July.

Benfica
In December 2009, after much speculation, Benfica signed Airton to a five-year contract. Flamengo received a sum around €1.1 million for 15% of his rights. In Portugal, he acted mainly as a back-up for starter Javi García for the second part of the 2009-10 season. After struggling to perform on the same level in the following season, Airton was loaned to Flamengo.

Return to Brazil
Airton returned to Flamengo from Benfica almost a year and a half after his original loan deal to Flamengo ended, penning a season-long loan deal on 10 June 2011.
In May 2012, it was extended until June 2013, but was eventually cut short as he moved teams. In February 2013, Internacional, signed Airton on loan until December 2013, for a reported €300,000 fee.

In January 2014, Airton moved to Botafogo until June 2014, with the loan deal being later extended until 30 June 2015, effectively meaning Airton will not return to Benfica. On 10 September 2014, Airton was sent off in a match against São Paulo after deliberately stepping on Alexandre Pato's head, and was suspended for two matches. He also faced a two-year suspension for refusing to take an anti-doping test, which he was later acquitted of.

On 10 September 2015, after his contract with Benfica ended, Airton signed a one-season deal with Botafogo.

Club statistics

Honours
Flamengo
Campeonato Carioca: 2008, 2009
Brazilian Série A: 2009

Benfica
Primeira Liga: 2009–10
Taça da Liga: 2009–10, 2010–11
Supertaça Cândido de Oliveira runner-up: 2010

Internacional
Campeonato Gaúcho: 2013

Individual
 Campeonato Carioca Team of the year: 2018

Notes

References

External links

 
 

Living people
1990 births
Brazilian footballers
Brazilian expatriate footballers
Association football midfielders
Footballers from Rio de Janeiro (city)
Campeonato Brasileiro Série A players
Campeonato Brasileiro Série B players
Primeira Liga players
Cypriot First Division players
Iraqi Premier League players
Nova Iguaçu Futebol Clube players
Mesquita Futebol Clube players
CR Flamengo footballers
Sport Club Internacional players
Botafogo de Futebol e Regatas players
S.L. Benfica footballers
Ermis Aradippou FC players
Erbil SC players
Al-Kahrabaa FC players
Brazilian expatriate sportspeople in Portugal
Brazilian expatriate sportspeople in Cyprus
Brazilian expatriate sportspeople in Iraq
Expatriate footballers in Portugal
Expatriate footballers in Cyprus
Expatriate footballers in Iraq